Ivan Rocha Limas (born 14 January 1969), known as Rocha, is a Brazilian retired professional footballer who played mainly as a central defender but also as a left back.

Club career
Rocha was born in São Paulo, and joined São Paulo FC's youth setup in 1983. Promoted to the first team in 1987, he was first-choice during the team's 1989 Campeonato Paulista-winning campaign while also being a regular starter during the 1990 season where they finished runners-up in the Série A; in the 1992 edition of the Copa Libertadores he featured in both legs of the finals as a left back, position where he acted during most of his spell under Telê Santana as the manager believed he was "more skillful" than Ronaldão, the habitual starter.

In 1992, 23-year-old Rocha joined Real Valladolid and helped to promotion from Segunda División in his first year. Having played in only 21 matches the defender scored an impressive nine goals (mostly from penalties), second-best in the squad with José Amavisca.

After another season, Rocha signed with fellow La Liga club Atlético Madrid. He played very rarely for the Colchoneros, also being loaned several times during his stint in Madrid (Valladolid again, CD Logroñés and RCD Mallorca) and being afflicted by several injuries.

Atlético released Rocha in the summer of 1998, and he played three more seasons in the country, one apiece with Deportivo Alavés, CD Numancia and Elche CF, the latter in the second division. In 2002 he returned to his country and appeared for Sport Club do Recife, União São João Esporte Clube and Paulista Futebol Clube, retiring at the age of 34 and later becoming a players' agent.

Honours
São Paulo
Campeonato Brasileiro Série A: 1991
Campeonato Paulista: 1989, 1991
Copa Libertadores: 1992

References

External links
 
 
 

1969 births
Living people
Footballers from São Paulo
Brazilian footballers
Association football defenders
Campeonato Brasileiro Série A players
Campeonato Brasileiro Série B players
São Paulo FC players
Sport Club do Recife players
União São João Esporte Clube players
Paulista Futebol Clube players
La Liga players
Segunda División players
Real Valladolid players
Atlético Madrid footballers
CD Logroñés footballers
Atlético Madrid B players
RCD Mallorca players
Deportivo Alavés players
CD Numancia players
Elche CF players
Brazil youth international footballers
Brazilian expatriate footballers
Expatriate footballers in Spain
Brazilian expatriate sportspeople in Spain
Association football agents